The 2008 PBA Fiesta Conference Finals was the best-of-7 championship series of the 2008 PBA Fiesta Conference and the conclusion of the conference's playoffs. The series was a best-of-seven affair and was the 95th championship disputed in the league.

Road to the finals

Series scoring summary

Game 1

Chris Alexander scored five of his seven fourth quarter points and came off with three offensive rebounds, each one proving crucial in helping the Kings stopped the Express' comeback bid from a 20-point third quarter deficit. Air21 whittled the deficit to as low as 90–96 on a hook by Steven Thomas, still 2:07 to go. Then Alexander canned in a charity off his offensive rebound and then tipped in a Jayjay Helterbrand miss to make it a nine-point game with 1:20 left. Eric Menk highlighted his best game in the conference by canning two charities in the first minute of the third period to earn his place as the 59th member of the league's 5,000-point club and his jumper from the left corner gave Ginebra its biggest lead at 64–44.

Game 2

Air21 outscored Ginebra on all quarters in dealing the Kings their first loss in their last 14 games. The Express buried the Kings completely in the third period with a 14–0 run that padded a 58-45 halftime lead to 72–45. Air21 would lead by as many as 35 points, 117–82, following a three-point play by rookie Marvin Cruz and a three-point bomb by fellow rookie JC Intal heading into the final 3:05. The Express not only leveled the series but it also halted Ginebra's franchise-best 13-game winning streak.

Game 3

KG Canaleta drained four triples in the most crucial stretches of the fourth period. Ginebra was in control for most of the game until the Express got things going in the third period and early in the fourth as Canaleta caught fire and Air21 outscored the Kings, 17–6, for an 87–76 lead. Chris Alexander was at the short end in several one-on-one confrontations with Steven Thomas in the second half and the loss put to naught his first PBA triple double of 14 points, 17 rebounds and 11 blocks. The 11 rejections was the most by any player in the last 19 years after Jerry Codinera swatted away the same number of attempts in a game for Purefoods in 1989. Toyota import Andy Fields holds the all-time record of 13.

Game 4

From a 43–40 lead at halftime, the Kings used a 9–0 run early in the third period capped by a three-point play from Junthy Valenzuela for a 52–43 lead. They led by as many as 15 points on a foul shot by Eric Menk, 83–68, with four minutes to play.

Game 5

The Express held Ginebra top gun Mark Caguioa to seven points in the contest and the entire Ginebra team scoreless in the last 2:44 of play. Arwind Santos took a crucial steal and a breakaway lay-up with 43.3 seconds to go. The Kings actually had a chance to send the game into overtime but Chris Alexander was called for a traveling violation with the team down by two and with only 2.6 seconds left.

Game 6

Air21 zoomed to a 14–0 lead as the Kings missed their first six shots and committed three of their six first half turnovers. The Express padded this to their biggest, 33–17, with 7:21 left in the second quarter. The half ended at 37–34 in favor of the Express, marking a magnificent rally by Ginebra in the final four minutes of the second period. Chris Alexander had a PBA career-best performance of 37 points 24 rebounds as he went on the attack mode in the third quarter with Thomas already in foul trouble, and the Kings rode on a 23-5 onslaught and closed out the third quarter with a 13–0 run to take a 61–55 lead.

Game 7

The Kings established leads of as many as 13 points, the last at 65-52 after a daredevil drive by Ronald Tubid heading into the final 7:34 of the third quarter. Chris Alexander played on the edge of fouling out with 10:37 left in the game but gallantly held on to stand at Ginebra's frontline of defense, holding the Express without a field goal in the last 4:27. Air21 led, 84–83, after an Arwind Santos follow up of his own miss, but that would prove to be the final time the Express would score as they lapsed into a mazed of errors and ill-advised shots.

Rosters

Barangay Ginebra Kings

Air21 Express

Broadcast notes
The 2008 Fiesta Conference is the last PBA tournament that will be broadcast by the Associated Broadcasting Company, as the network declines renewal of its broadcast rights following its blocktime deal with MPB Primedia, Inc. Afterwards, Radio Philippines Network will be the PBA's new broadcaster. Following Game 2 on August 8, ABC was reformatted as TV5, but the network continued to broadcast the finals under the auspices of MPB Primedia. The championship series was the last PBA event covered under the ABC name and the only PBA event covered under the TV5 name until 2013.

The finals broadcasters are:

References

External links
PBA official website

2008
2007–08 PBA season
Barangay Ginebra San Miguel games
PBA Fiesta Conference Finals